Van Impe or van Impe may refer to:

Darren Van Impe (born 1973), Canadian ice hockey player
Ed Van Impe (born 1940), Canadian ice hockey player
Jack Van Impe (1931–2020), American televangelist
Jacques Van Impe (born 1941), Belgian ornithologist
Kevin van Impe (born 1981), Belgian cyclist
Lucien Van Impe (born 1946), Belgian cyclist

Surnames of Dutch origin